FC Sokil Zolochiv is a Ukrainian football club from Zolochiv, Lviv Oblast that currently competes at the Amateur level. The club entered the Ukrainian Amateur Championships in 2008. Also they compete in the Lvivska Oblast competition.

History
In their history the club also played in the professional leagues. After performing well in the amateur competitions Sokil Zolochiv entered the Ukrainian Second League in 2000.
They finish 2nd in their initial season as well as in the 2001–2002 season and were promoted into the Ukrainian First League.

During the 2002–03 season they performed one of the biggest upsets in modern Ukrainian Football when they eliminated Ukrainian Premier League side FC Metalurh Zaporizhzhia in the 2002–03 Ukrainian Cup 1/16 finals. Later in the season the club removed themselves from the Persha Liha competition and returned to the regional Lviv Oblast competition.

Honors
Ukrainian Druha Liha: 

Runners Up: 2

 2000/01 Group A
 2001/02 Group A

League and cup history

{|class="wikitable"
|-bgcolor="#efefef"
! Season
! Div.
! Pos.
! Pl.
! W
! D
! L
! GS
! GA
! P
!Domestic Cup
!colspan=2|Europe
!Notes
|-
|-
|align=center|2000–01
|align=center|3rd "A"
|align=center bgcolor=silver|2
|align=center|30
|align=center|20
|align=center|8
|align=center|2
|align=center|48
|align=center|6
|align=center|68
|align=center|1/8 finals
|align=center|
|align=center|
|align=center|
|-
|align=center|2001–02
|align=center|3rd "A"
|align=center bgcolor=silver|2
|align=center|36
|align=center|26
|align=center|5
|align=center|5
|align=center|80
|align=center|26
|align=center|83
|align=center|3rd Round
|align=center|
|align=center|
|align=center bgcolor=green|promoted
|-
|align=center|2002–03
|align=center|2nd
|align=center|18
|align=center|34
|align=center|4
|align=center|7
|align=center|23
|align=center|23
|align=center|39
|align=center|19
|align=center|1/8 finals
|align=center|
|align=center|
|align=center|Withdrawn
|-
|align=center|2003–2008
|align=center colspan=13|Club competes at the Amateur level (Lvivska Oblast)
|-
|align=center|2008
|align=center|4th
|align=center|2
|align=center|8
|align=center|5
|align=center|0
|align=center|3
|align=center|14
|align=center|13
|align=center|15
|align=center|
|align=center|
|align=center|
|align=center|
|}

References

 
Amateur football clubs in Ukraine
Football clubs in Lviv Oblast
Association football clubs established in 1976
1976 establishments in Ukraine